Holon–Wolfson railway station is a railway station in the border of Holon and Tel Aviv in the south of Tel Aviv-Yafo Municipality, on the Rosh HaAyin–Beersheba line. The station is in the Wolfson interchange on the Ayalon Highway, nearby Wolfson Medical Center.

Train service 
All trains serving the Rosh HaAyin–Beersheba line stop at this station, as well as at all stations of the line.

On most weekday hours there is a train every 30 minutes each direction. On rush hours there is a train every 15 minutes each direction. Some of the southbound trains terminate at Rishon LeZion Moshe Dayan or Ashkelon and do not continue to Be'er Sheva.

Public transport connections 
Nearby the station and Wolfson Medical Center, there is a bus terminal with local bus routes that link the station to Holon, Bat Yam, Rishon LeZion and southern Tel Aviv. On the terminal itself you can't enter the bus and you need to wait to the bus at the entrance of Wolfson Medical Center.

References

External links

Railway stations in Tel Aviv District
Holon
2011 establishments in Israel
Railway stations opened in 2011